HMS Cotton (K510) was a  of the British Royal Navy that served in World War II. The ship was transferred to the UK under Lend-Lease on 8 November 1943, and named after Rear-Admiral Sir Charles Cotton, an officer who served in the American Revolutionary, French Revolutionary and Napoleonic Wars.

Service history
Cotton served as a convoy escort from May to December 1944, operating mostly between Liverpool and Gibraltar. Between 25 June and 29 August 1945 she was commanded by Lt. Dudley Davenport.

Cotton was returned to the U.S. Navy on 5 November 1945, and struck from the Navy List on 3 January 1946, and subsequently sold for scrapping that year.

References

1943 ships
Ships built in Hingham, Massachusetts
Captain-class frigates
Buckley-class destroyer escorts
World War II frigates of the United Kingdom